Gülbahçe can refer to:

 Gülbahçe, İnegöl
 Gülbahçe, İzmir
 Gülbahçe, Kemah